IBM has offered COBOL on many platforms, starting with the IBM 1400 series and IBM 7000 series, continuing into the industry-dominant IBM System/360 and IBM System/370 mainframe systems, and then through Power Systems (AIX) and IBM Z ( z/OS, z/VSE, z/VSE).

At the height of COBOL usage in the 1960s through 1980s, the IBM COBOL product was the most important of any industry COBOL compilers. In his popular textbook A Simplified Guide to Structured COBOL Programming, Daniel D. McCracken tries to make the treatment general for any machine and compiler, but when he gives details for a particular one, they are to the IBM COBOL compiler and for a System/370. Similary, another popular textbook of the time, Stern and Stern's Structured COBOL Programming, tries to present an implementation-independent explanation of the language, but the appendix giving the full syntax of the language is explicitly for IBM COBOL, with its extensions to the language highlighted. 

Use of IBM COBOL was so widespread that Capex Corporation, an independent software vendor, made a post-code generation phase object code optimizer for it. The Capex Optimizer became a quite successful product.

Although the IBM COBOL Compiler Family web site only mentions AIX and z/OS, IBM still offers COBOL on z/VM and z/VSE.

Products

The current IBM COBOL compiler family consists of the following products:
 Enterprise COBOL for z/OS 
 COBOL for AIX 
 COBOL for Linux on x86 
 Automatic Binary Optimizer for z/OS (ABO) 
 COBOL for OS/390 & VM
 COBOL for VSE/ESA
 Development Studio for i

IBM COBOL compiler name, version, release, product numbers, GA and EOS dates 

Check the lifecycle details (lifecycle dates, announcement letters, and other information) for Enterprise COBOL for z/OS products.

References

External links
IBM Enterprise COBOL for z/OS related links:
 COBOL for z/OS Community
 COBOL for z/OS Documentation Library
 COBOL for z/OS Migration Portal

IBM COBOL for AIX related links:
 COBOL for AIX Community
 COBOL for AIX Documentation Library

IBM COBOL for Linux on x86 related links:
 IBM COBOL for Linux on x86

IBM COBOL Compilers Support: IBM Support Portal

COBOL
Compilers
COBOL